United Nations Security Council resolution 741, adopted without a vote on 7 February 1992, after examining the application of the Republic of Turkmenistan for membership in the United Nations, the Council recommended to the General Assembly that Turkmenistan be admitted.

See also
 Member states of the United Nations
 List of United Nations Security Council Resolutions 701 to 800 (1991–1993)

References
Text of the Resolution at undocs.org

External links
 

 0741
 0741
 0741
February 1992 events
1992 in Turkmenistan